Pierre Olivaint (1816–1871) was a French Jesuit, born in Paris, 22 February 1816.

Early life
Pierre Olivaint was born in 1816. His parents were not religious. 

At twenty, he left home, and the College of Charlemagne, where he had studied, imbued him with the doctrines of Voltaire. He wrote at this time: "I desire, if by any possibility I should become a priest, to be a missionary, and if I am a missionary to be a martyr." In 1836, he entered the École Normale. Led at first by Buchez's neo-Catholicism, then won by the sermons of Lacordaire, he made his profession of faith to Father Ravignan (1837). At the École Normale he formed a Catholic group. The Conferences of St. Vincent de Paul attracted the élite of the schools, and Olivaint with twelve of his companions established them in the parish of Saint Ménard. In 1836, Olivaint heard that Lacordaire was going to restore the Dominican Order in France. Several of his friends had already decided to follow Lacordaire; he had the duty of supporting his mother.

Career
After a year of professorship at Grenoble, he returned to Paris, and occupied the chair of history at Bourbon College; in 1841 he accepted a position as tutor to the young George de la Rochefoucaud.

In 1842 Olivaint won the junior fellowship in a history competition. His lecture was on Pope Gregory VII, and M. Saint-Marc Girardin closed the assembly with these words: "We have just heard virtue, pleading the cause of virtue". At this time war was declared against the Jesuits. Quinet and Michelet changed their lectures into impassioned attacks against the society. On 2 May 1845, Adolphe Thiers was to conduct before the assembly an interpellation against these religious. Olivaint saw that it was his duty to be present. "I hesitated" he said to Louis Veuillot, "I hesitate no longer. M. Thiers shows me my duty. I must follow it. I enter to-day." And the day of the proposed interpellation he entered the novitiate of Laval. 

After a year's novitiate he was made professor of history at the College of Brugelette, in Belgium. On 3 May 1847, he made his first vows, and on the completion of theological studies he received holy orders. 

In the meanwhile the law of 1850 had established, in France, the right of controlling education. Olivaint was summoned to Paris, where he remained. On 3 May 1852, Pierre arrived at the College of Vaugirard of which the Jesuits had accepted charge. He was to spend thirteen years here, first as professor and prefect of studies, and then as rector. Among his works were "L'oeuvre de L'Enfant Jésus pour la prèmiere communion des juenes filles pauvres", and "L'oeuvre de Saint François-Xavier" for the workmen of the parish of Vaugirard.

After twenty-five years devoted to teaching, Father Olivaint was named Superior of the House in Paris (1865). In the meantime, a spirit of revolt agitated Paris and spread throughout France. In January, 1870, Father Olivaint wrote, "Persecution is upon us; it will be terrible; we will pass through torrents of blood." T

Death
On 4 April 1871, the fédérés arrested Mgr Darboy and several others. On the fifth, they took possession of the house on the Rue de Sèvres and Father Olivaint quietly gave himself up. On 24 May, Mgr Darboy and five other prisoners were executed; on the twenty-sixth, fifty-two victims, Father Olivaint marching at their head, were dragged through Paris and massacred in the Rue Haxo. The next day the Paris Commune was overthrown. 

The remains of Father Olivaint and the four priests who fell with him (Fathers Ducoudray, Caubert, Clere, and de Bengy) were placed in a chapel in the Rue de Sèvres.

See also
Conférence Olivaint

References

Clair, Pierre Olivaint prêtre de la Compagnie de Jésus (Paris, 1878); 
de Ponlevoy, Actes de la captivité et de la morte des PP. Olivaint, Ducoudray, etc. (Paris, 1878); 
Olivaint, Journal de ses retraites annuelles (2 vols, Paris, 1872).

External links
Catholic Encyclopedia article

1816 births
1871 deaths
Clergy from Paris
19th-century French Jesuits